Aithalakkadi is a 2010 Indian Kannada comedy film directed by J.G. Krishna. The film stars Rangayana Raghu and Bullet Prakash in leading roles. The music of the film was composed by Sadhu Kokila.

Cast

Rangayana Raghu as Raghu 
Bullet Prakash as Prakasha 
 Sangeetha as Raghu's wife
Neethu Shobaraj
Sharan
Girija Lokesh
Padmaja Rao
Karibasavaiah
Honnavalli Krishna
Malavalli Saikrishna
Bank Janardhan
M. S. Umesh
Sudeep ... Guest appearance
V. Ravichandran ... Guest appearance
Vijay Raghavendra ... Guest appearance
Jaggesh ... Guest appearance

Soundtrack

Reception

Critical response 

A critic from The Times of India scored the film at 3 out of 5 stars and says "While Rangayana Raghu is simply superb, Bullet Prakash excels. Sadhu Kokila's role as film director keeps you in good humour. Neethu is a treat to watch in the role of Sevanthi. Music by Sadhu Kokila is okay". Shruti Indira Lakshminarayana of Rediff.com scored the film at 1.5 out of 5 stars and says "The hurried climax in which Vijay Raghavendra appears is also unjustified. Some more time could have been dedicated to Bullet Prakash's flashback track. Sadu Kokhila's music has nothing much to offer either. The film rests on an interesting story line, if only the narrative backed the plot". A critic from Deccan Herald wrote "The same time could have been spent better on developing the track involving Prakash. Indeed, the climax looks a little out of place with hurried placements etc. Still, the film appeals on a basic level with each actor pitching in realistic performances. Sadhu Kokila’s comedy track is an example of how jaded humour can also evoke at least a tired giggle. Choreography and action sequences are “mast-mast” ".

References

External links

2010 films
2010s Kannada-language films
Films scored by S. P. Venkatesh